Kingshill, King's Hill or Kings Hill may refer to:
Kingshill, U.S. Virgin Islands, a town on Saint Croix
Cirencester Kingshill School, Gloucestershire, England
King's Hill, Hampshire, a hill in England
King's Hill, Walsall, an area of Wednesbury, West Midlands, England
King's Hill Historic District, Portland, Oregon
Kings Hill, village and parish in Kent, England
Kings Hill, Rutland, a hill in England
Kings Hill Pass, Montana